The Galway-Mayo Institute of Technology (GMIT) was an institute of technology, located in Galway, Ireland. In April 2022, it was formally dissolved, and its functions were transferred to Atlantic Technological University (ATU). Now a constituent institute of ATU, it has facilities in the west of Ireland. GMIT's campuses are located in Galway City, Castlebar, Letterfrack and Mountbellew. GMIT won The Sunday Times Institute of Technology of the Year award in 2004, 2007, 2015 and 2022. GMIT also has a number of specialist research centres and two Innovation Hubs (in Galway and Mayo).

History
The institute was founded in 1972 as Regional Technical College Galway.

In 1975, the first bachelor's degree course was approved at a regional technical college, and by May 1977 the first degrees were conferred, a B.A. in Hotel and Catering Management.

In the 1980s it developed partnerships with other educational providers in the region including the Franciscan Agricultural College, Mountbellew (established 1904) and Connemara West in Letterfrack. In 1994 it opened a campus at Castlebar, County Mayo (the former St. Mary's Hospital, Castlebar) and at Cluain Mhuire in Galway city. Galway RTC like other regional technical colleges gained autonomy in 1992. In 1997 the college was renamed Galway-Mayo Institute of Technology.

Presidents of GMIT
In December 2019, Dr. Orla Flynn was appointed president of GMIT, succeeding, Dr. Fergal Barry who was appointed in 2015 and resigned, in May 2019. Previous presidents (or directors or principals as the post was previously called) of the college include Michael Carmody (2012-2015), and Marion Coy (2002-2011). Dr. Gay Corr was head of GMIT from its foundation as Galway RTC in 1972 until 2002.

Buildings and sites

Galway campus
GMIT Galway campus is based on the Dublin Road in Galway city, overlooking Galway Bay. It is the administrative headquarters for the institute and has four schools of study; the School of Business, the School of Engineering, the School of Science & Computing, and Galway International Hotel School.

Also located at this campus are the Innovation Hub, the Lifelong Learning Centre and the Research, Development & Innovation Centre.

Centre for Creative Arts and Media (CCAM)
GMIT's Centre for Creative Arts and Media (CCAM) is located a mile from the main campus on the Monivea Road. It is based in an old Redemptorist Monastery and is now the location of an Art, Design and Media college.

It offers undergraduate courses in design, contemporary arts, film & documentary, textiles and fine art. In 2016, it introduced post-graduate courses in Creative Practice to support artists, designers and filmmakers.

The annual graduate exhibitions and screenings showcase the work being produced throughout the academic year.

Mayo campus

GMIT Mayo campus is located at Castlebar on approximately 20 hectares of land.

Degree courses on offer include business, engineering, humanities, nursing and social care, and technology. GMIT Mayo campus also offers a wide range of Lifelong Learning courses, and has an Innovation Hub to support entrepreneurs and start-up businesses.

Letterfrack campus

GMIT Letterfrack campus is the National Centre of Excellence for Furniture Design and Wood Technology, and has been involved with the study of furniture design since 1987.

It offers degree courses in furniture design and manufacture, furniture and wood technology, and teacher education (construction studies and DCG). 
The campus is located in Connemara in County Galway.

Mountbellew campus
Mountbellew was the first agricultural college in Ireland, set up by the Franciscan Brothers in 1904. The original college was demolished in 1971 and replaced with the new building in 1975. In 1986, the Franciscan Brothers Agricultural College established a link with GMIT to deliver a Higher Certificate in Business Studies (Agribusiness).

Today, GMIT students in Mountbellew can choose between three types of degree (Agri-Business, Agri-Science or Agri-Engineering) and spend time between the Mountbellew and Galway campuses.

Atlantic Technological University

With alliances made in 2012, by 2015, GMIT, along with IT Sligo and Letterkenny IT, submitted a formal Expression of Interest to the Higher Education Authority (HEA) for re-designation as a Technological University. This partnership, known as the Connacht-Ulster Alliance (CUA), aims to establish a Technological University of Western & Northwestern Ireland and was still in the planning stage in October 2018.

The plan was a tenet of the GMIT strategic plan 2019 – 2023.

The CUA planned to make a formal application in 2021, with a TU beginning operations in 2022. In October 2020, the constituent IT's were allocated over €5.5 million towards transformation.

On 28 October 2021, an announcement was made by the Minister for Further and Higher Education, Research, Innovation and Science, Simon Harris, TD, that together GMIT, LYIT and IT Sligo were approved for designation as a Technological University (TU).

On 23 November 2021, it was announced that the name of the new TU would be Atlantic Technological University (ATU). ATU was formally established on 1 April 2022.

GMIT Innovation Hubs – Galway and Mayo
Galway-Mayo Institute of Technology (GMIT) established two Innovation Hubs (iHubs) at its Galway and Mayo campuses in 2005 and 2006 respectively with support from Enterprise Ireland.
 
These iHubs provide a range of start-up spaces and a portfolio of Business Development Supports to start-up enterprises. The iHubs also provide a number of Entrepreneur Development Programmes including ‘New Frontiers’ (Enterprise Ireland's national entrepreneur development programme for innovative, early stage start-ups), and ‘Empower’ – a dedicated entrepreneurship programme for women, sponsored by the European Social Fund and Department of Justice and Equality.

GMIT is planning to double the size of its iHub building at the Galway campus following successful funding approval from Enterprise Ireland, which was officially announced in May 2017.

The proposed extension will increase the floor space of the iHub to circa 2,400 square metres from its current 1,150 square metres. The extended Galway iHub will provide space for over 40 incubation start-ups including dedicated space for MedTech enterprises, Digital Tech start-ups, a co-working space, an Entrepreneurship Hub, social and events space.

See GMIT Innovation Hubs | GMIT

Student life
Clubs and Societies at GMIT aim to promote community, personal development and student involvement.

Clubs
GMIT offers a diverse range of more than 30 different sports clubs.

Clubs have achieved notable national and international success in recent years: Senior Hurling Cup Champions (2019), Boxing Intervarsity Champions (2019), Fresher Hurling League & Championship Winners, GMIT Ladies Soccer – Division 1 Cup Champions (2019), Equestrian – Dressage Category champions (2019), Ladies Football – Donaghy Cup Champions (2019), Cheerleading – International World Champions at the UCA College World Championship in Orlando Florida.

Clubs available for students

•	Airsoft Club	•	Cricket Club
	•	Ladies Soccer	•	Rowing
•	Athletics Club	•	Equestrian Club
	•	Mens Rugby	•	Cheerleading

•	Archery Club	•	Ladies Football
	•	Sub Aqua Club	•	Ultimate Frisbee

•	Badminton Club
	•	Fresher Hurling
	•	Mens Soccer	•	Hockey
•	Men's Basketball
	•	Ladies Basketball
	•	Ladies Volleyball 	•	Ladies Rugby

•	Boxing 	•	Senior Hurling
	•	Mens Volleyball 	•	Handball
•	Camogie 	•	Karate Club
	•	Sailing	•	Swim 
•	Cricket Club	•	Kayak Club
	•	Surf	•	Kickboxing

Societies
Societies at GMIT give students a chance to explore and participate in interests they might not encounter in their studies.

Societies available for students
•	African	•	Comedy	•	Engineering	•	LGBT
•	Art	•	Habitat for Humanity	•	Fianna Fáil	•	Marketing
•	Agri Business	•	Heritage	•	Film & TV	•	Music
•	Anime & Manga	•	International	•	Fine Gael	•	Nutrition
•	Best Buddies	•	Debating	•	First Aid	•	Photography
•	Business	•	Digital Media	•	Gaisce	•	Radio
•	Chemistry	•	DJ	•	Gaming	•	Sculpture
•	Choir	•	Eco Soc	•	Irish Soc	•	Sign Language
•    GMIT Student Managed Investment Fund (www.gmitsmf.com)

Students Union
The Students Union at GMIT aims to represent students on all levels, throughout the institute, from class reps attending SU council and Programme boards to full-time sabbatical officers serving students on Governing Body and Academic Council. The Student Union supports students with a wide range of academic, social, welfare and financial issues. Their website is www.gmitsu.ie

GMIT Healthy Campus
Healthy Campus is a cross-campus working group, consisting of staff and students, which has signed up to the Healthy Ireland Healthy Campus initiative. Amongst other activities, their current five target areas for development are:
•	Introducing a "Clean Air – No Smoking or Vaping Campus" on 01/01/2020
•	Positive Mental Health & Wellbeing Initiatives
•	The Introduction of a Nutrition Traffic Lights System in the canteen
•	Supporting students with Alcohol, Drugs and Tobacco reduction/safer use.
•	The delivery of Consent workshops to all first-year students.

International students
GMIT welcomes more than 40 different nationalities represented across five campuses, and offers international students:

A first-class education
An English-speaking environment
A rich European and Irish cultural experience

Graduation
As a multi-campus institution, annually GMIT hosts its graduation ceremonies separately for its Galway, Letterfrack and Mayo graduates. The 2019 conferring took place in GMIT Letterfrack, Galmont Hotel, Galway and Royal Theatre, Castlebar, Mayo.

Notable alumni
Mark Boyle (born 1979), Irish writer best known for living without money from November 2008
Robert Sheehan (born 1988), Irish actor
Brian Walsh (born 1972), Irish politician
Fintan Warfield (born 1992), Irish politician
Jennifer Whitmore, Irish politician

Controversy
In December 2020, videos began circulating on social media of two women lecturers insulting their students, with many identified by name. GMIT president Orla Flynn apologised for the "data breach" and said "and some of the comments made by our staff do not reflect the values to which we aspire"; she did not apologise publicly for the conduct of the women lecturers but said GMIT would apologise directly.

Also in December 2020, a Freedom of Information request revealed that GMIT had spent €5,217 investigating claims of sexual harassment.

See also
 Education in the Republic of Ireland

References

External links
Official site – Galway-Mayo Institute of Technology (as ATU)
Official site - Atlantic Technological University

Atlantic Technological University
Castlebar
Education in County Galway
Education in County Mayo
Universities and colleges in the Republic of Ireland
Institutes of technology in the Republic of Ireland
Art schools in Ireland
Educational institutions established in 1972
Educational institutions disestablished in 2022
Former universities and colleges in the Republic of Ireland
1972 establishments in Ireland
2022 disestablishments in Ireland